Argentina participated in the 2015 Parapan American Games.

Competitors
The following table lists Argentina's delegation per sport and gender.

Medalists

|align="left" valign="top"|

|align="left" valign="top"|

Archery

Argentina sent one male athlete to compete.

Athletics

Argentina sent 22 male and 11 female athletes to compete.

Men

Field events

Women

Field events

Boccia

Argentina sent seven male and three female athletes to compete.

Individual

Team & Pairs competitions

Cycling

Argentina sent nine male and three female athletes to compete.

 Road

 Track

Key:
Q – qualified to gold medal race
q – qualified to bronze medal race
OVL – overlapped

Football 5-a-side

Argentina sent a team of ten athletes to compete:

Federico Acardi
Angel Deldo Garcia
Maximiliano Espinillo
Dario Lencina
German Muleck
Koki Padilla
David Peralta
Lucas Rodriguez
Nico Veliz
Silvio Velo

Preliminary Round

Gold-medal match

Football 7-a-side

Argentina sent a team of 14 athletes to compete.

Alberto Alabarce
Matias Bassi
Duncan Coronel
Mariano Cortes
Maximiliano Fernandez
Matias Fernandez Romano
Claudio Figuera
Ezequiel Jaime
Rodrigo Lugrin
Rodrigo Luquez
Lautaro Marzolini
Pablo Molina Lopez
Mariano Morana
Gustavo Nahuelquin

Preliminary Round

Gold-medal match

Goalball

Argentina sent a team of six athletes to compete in the men's tournament.

Alejandro Almada
Patricio Finoli
Daniel Gomez
Hector Kloster
Tobias Ramos
Marcelo Sarmiento

Preliminary Round

Semifinal

Bronze-medal match

Judo

Argentina sent five male and three female athletes to compete.

Men

Women

Powerlifting

Argentina sent three male and one female athletes to compete.

Swimming

Argentina sent eighteen male and seven female swimmers to compete.

Men

Women

Table tennis

Argentina sent twelve male and four female table tennis players to compete.

Men

Women's

Wheelchair basketball

Argentina sent a team of twelve male athletes and a team of twelve female athletes to compete in the men's and women's tournaments.

Men

Adolfo Berdun
Daniel Copa
Mario Dominguez
Carlos Esteche
Joel Gabas
Cristian Gomez
Julio Kowalczuk
Fernando Ovejero
Adrian J. Perez
Amado Perez
Maximiliano Ruggeri
Gustavo Villafane

Group B

Quarterfinal

Semifinal

Bronze-medal match

Women

Alejandra Alonso
Marcela Birck
Mariana Capdeville
Maria Castaldi
Monica Chazarreta
Maria Chirinos
Constanza Coronel
Silvia Linari
Adriana Motura
Julieta Olmedo
Fernanda Pallares
Mariana Perez

Group B

Semifinal

Bronze-medal match

Wheelchair rugby

Argentina sent a team of twelve athletes to compete.

Leonardo Abess
Ignacio Arhancet
Lucas Camussi
Fernando Canumil
Matias Cardozo
Juan Foa
Mariano Gastaldi
Juan Herrar
Brian Nascimento
Fernando Pantin Colombo
Nicolas Stupenengo
Daniel Viegas

Preliminary Round

Fifth place match

Wheelchair tennis

Argentina sent two male athletes to compete.

See also
Argentina at the 2016 Summer Olympics
Argentina at the 2016 Summer Paralympics
Argentina at the 2015 Pan American Games

References

2015 in Argentine sport
Nations at the 2015 Parapan American Games